The 2022 European Modern Pentathlon Championships was held from 13 to 19 September 2022 in Székesfehérvár, Hungary.

Medal summary

Men's events

Women's events

Mixed events

Medal table

References

External links
Official site

2022
2022 in modern pentathlon
2022 in Hungarian sport
September 2022 sports events in Hungary